James Howell Wilhoit II (born  June 30, 1983) was the placekicker for the University of Tennessee football team between 2003 and 2006.

High school  
Wilhoit attended Hendersonville High School in Hendersonville, Tennessee where he received All-American honors from PARADE, PrepStar, SuperPrep, Student Sports and Borderwars.com.

College 
Wilhoit redshirted his freshman year, but went on to become a four-year  starter at Tennessee where he handled field goal and extra point attempts and kickoffs. Wilhoit was known for ability to make field goals in the clutch during his four-year career.  When he left Tennessee he was the second leading scorer in school history.  His last-minute field goals included a 50-yard field goal with 6 seconds left to give Tennessee to a 30–28 victory over Florida in 2004.  Earlier in the quarter he missed an extra point that would have tied the game.  Wilhoit ranks in the all-time top five in several kicking categories at UT.  He made 59 of 82 field goal attempts (72%)  and kicked 47% of his kickoffs for touchbacks during his career.   He became the 2nd all-time leading scorer at Tennessee with 325 points.   He led the SEC in scoring with 96 points in 2006 and was ranked 7th in SEC history.

Professional football career 
Wilhoit was not selected in the 2007 NFL draft, but signed with the Baltimore Ravens as a rookie free agent on May 4, 2007. He was later released from the team in July shortly before the 2007 NFL preseason began. In late 2007, Wilhoit signed with the New All American Football League that never played a game.  He helped promote the league by doing several autograph signings. He also played for the Kansas City Command of the Arena Football League in 2012, converting 8 of 21 field goal attempts and 62 of 77 extra point attempts.

Currently
Wilhoit recently studied under Special Teams Coach Gary Zauner for six months to learn his kicking and punting techniques. In addition to Coach Zauner, he has trained under Coach Bill Renner in Chapel Hill, North Carolina.

Honors 
2006 Lou Groza Place Kicker Award (semifinalist) 
 2006 All-SEC 
 2005 Academic All-SEC 
 SEC Special Teams Player of the Week (September 18, 2004) 
 2004 Academic All-SEC 
 2003 Freshman All-America Scripps Howard/FWAA and The Sporting News (2nd) 
 2003 Freshman All-SEC 
 SEC Freshman Academic Honor Roll

Notes

External links
Wilhoit web site

1983 births
Living people
People from Hendersonville, Tennessee
American football placekickers
Tennessee Volunteers football players
Kansas City Command players
Baltimore Ravens players
Players of American football from Tennessee